Alexander Mayer (born 7 July 1967) is a German former swimmer. He competed in two events at the 1988 Summer Olympics representing West Germany.

References

External links
 

1967 births
Living people
German male swimmers
Olympic swimmers of West Germany
Swimmers at the 1988 Summer Olympics
People from Kaufbeuren
Sportspeople from Swabia (Bavaria)